The 2016 São Tomé (Island or Regional) Second Division was the third season of the fourth-tier competition that took place that season, also being the nation's lowest. The club was the first that featured ten clubs. 6 de Setembro won the title and participated in the Second Division in the following season, second placed FC Ribeira Peixe was also promoted A total of 85 out of 90 matches were played with the final round not played and 281 goals were scored.

Overview
6 de Setembro scored the most goals numbering 48, second was fifth placed Andorinha with 32 and third was Ribeira Peixe with 31. The fewest was sixth placed Conde with 20 and third was Porto Alegre with 21. On the opposites, Cruz Vermelha conceded the most with 48, second most was Varzim with 27 and third most was Porto Alegre with 35. The fewest goals conceded was Ribeira Peixe with 15, second least was 6 de Setembro with 17.

Teams

Division table

Notes

References

Football competitions in São Tomé and Príncipe
Sao Tome
Sao Tome
Sao Tome Second Division